When the Morning Comes may refer to:

When the Morning Comes (A Great Big World album), 2015
When the Morning Comes (Marit Larsen album), 2014
"When the Morning Comes" (song), a 1974 country song by American singer Hoyt Axton
"When the Morning Comes", a song from Abandoned Luncheonette, a 1973 album by American duo Hall & Oates
"When the Morning Comes", a 1992 single by British band Love Decade
"When The Morning Comes," from the album, Kalapana (1975)

See also
"This Too Shall Pass" (OK Go song), a song by American alternative-rock band OK Go, whose chorus consists of the repeated line "when the morning comes"
 "Then the Morning Comes", a 1999 song by Smash Mouth